Stephen Charles Vasciannie is a Jamaican law professor. Formerly Deputy Solicitor-General and principal of the Norman Manley Law School, Vasciannie served as Jamaica's Ambassador Extraordinary Plenipotentiary to the United States from 2012 up to July 17, 2015, when he stepped down to return to academic life.

In politics and government

Vasciannie was one of the founding members of the National Democratic Movement (NDM) along with former Prime Minister of Jamaica Bruce Golding. He served as Deputy Solicitor-General until 2007. The Public Services Commission recommended that year that he be appointed Solicitor-General, however, Golding, whose relationship with Vasciannie had deteriorated since Golding's departure from the NDM, did not accept Vasciannie's nomination; instead, Golding fired all the members of the commission, and the new commission members appointed chose Douglas Leys to assume the office of Solicitor-General instead. Preceding the People's National Party victory in the 2012 general election Vasciannie was named Jamaica's ambassador to the United States in June 2012, and succeeded Jamaican businesswoman Audrey Marks, who was appointed under the Golding administration.

Other activities

In 2006, when Dehring Bunting and Golding (DB&G) was purchased by the Bank of Nova Scotia, the new owners appointed him DB&G's new chairman of the board. That year he was also elected to his first term as a member of the United Nations International Law Commission (UNILC). He was appointed principal of the Norman Manley Law School in July 2008 after the death of Keith Sobion. In 2010, Anglican Diocese of Jamaica Bishop Alfred Reid wrote to him to ask him to serve as chairman of the board of governors of Kingston College, which he accepted, succeeding Crafton Miller. He was elected to a second term on the UNILC in November 2011. He is also a professor of law at the University of the West Indies.

Personal life

Vasciannie did his secondary education at Kingston College (Jamaica), where he was head boy. He went on to the University of the West Indies, where he earned a B.Sc. in economics with first class honours, and was the recipient of the UWI Open Scholarship in 1978. He received a Rhodes Scholarship to study at the University of Oxford in 1981; he would later earn a B.A. in jurisprudence from Oxford, an LL.M. in international law from Gonville and Caius College, Cambridge, and a Ph.D. in international law from Oxford.

References

Year of birth missing (living people)
Living people
Alumni of Gonville and Caius College, Cambridge
Alumni of the University of Oxford
Ambassadors of Jamaica to the United States
Jamaican academics
Jamaican expatriates in the United Kingdom
National Democratic Movement (Jamaica) politicians
University of the West Indies academics
University of the West Indies alumni
Members of the International Law Commission